Giffgaff is a MVNO, marketed as a budget service provider and flanker brand of Telefónica UK (trading as O2 UK). The brand was founded by Gav Thompson a former marketing executive for Telefónica UK and was launched on 25 November 2009.

Products and services 
At launch, Giffgaff's first product was a prepaid SIM card providing all standard 2G and 3G mobile phone services and charging on a pay-as-you-go basis. Following this, Giffgaff announced bundles of minutes, texts, and data, called "goodybags". The idea for bundles emerged from the community forums.

In June 2012, it was announced that customers could renew "goodybags" automatically via a PayPal account when saved on their platform payment profile. 

In 2011, Giffgaff added data-only tethering plans called "gigabags" to their lineup of product plans. Giffgaff has since retired "gigabags", as their "goodybag" plans now allow members to tether to other devices within their data allowances without tethering restrictions.

In March 2014, Giffgaff announced that it would add a line of 4G LTE "goodybags" with purchase available starting April 2014. 

In May 2014, Giffgaff announced that they were now an official Apple carrier, which was closely followed by another announcement that they would soon be stocking iPhones in their online shop – this would unlock options on iPhones that would have normally been locked for users, including tethering and voicemail options. iPhone devices went on sale starting 4 June 2014, to accompany a wide range of manufacturers including Samsung handsets. Refurbished devices have become a purchase option, with a Giffgaff 12-month+ warranty included. On 2 November 2020, Giffgaff announced that they are terminating their business relationship with RateSetter, the peer-to-peer lender. Giffgaff's new phone loan initiative is with Klarna Bank AB, known as Klarna, a Swedish bank that provides financial services.

From 2020, all goodybags now include unlimited minutes and texts to standard UK numbers. Full speed data allowances range from 1GB to unlimited. The prices listed are between £6 - £35 per month and are reviewed periodically. In August 2020, the company launched its 9GB golden goodybag to compete directly with its own 6GB goodybag product, both priced at £10. In August 2021, the company launched a third £10 product, their "Student Golden Goodybag", debuting at 13GB of data later increasing to 15 GB. The Student Golden goodybag was retired in July 2022. 

To be eligible to purchase from the selection of "golden goodybags", the member must register a bank payment method and agree to recurring monthly purchases. There is no ongoing commitment and the recur can be switched off or cancelled at will. On 20 October 2020, Giffgaff introduced their "unlimited golden goodybag" priced at £35 a month. At the same time, they announced future 5G access for customers on all golden goodybag products using their new 5G sim. In January 2021, the goodybag range was expanded to give more data. From 24 February 2021, using pay-as-you-go data without a "goodybag" doubled in price from 5p MB to 10p MB. In 2022 Giffgaff announced a price freeze until the end of 2023 for UK domestic tariffs and became 5G ready for all giffgaff customers in the UK

Customer Service 
Giffgaff does not operate customer service phone helplines. Non-account-specific problems are raised via an online community system and are answered by other Giffgaff members in exchange for "payback points" (a virtual currency). Account-specific queries are directed to "agents", who are contracted by giffgaff Limited through a hiring agency to administer account matters. If neither of these avenues resolves the issues, there is a dedicated complaint team, who responds to complaints by email and a dedicated voicemail only, phone number. Written replies can take at least five working days to receive. In March 2023, agents, (who have access to customers accounts) reduced working contact hours were shared with customers.

Monday to Friday: 8am - 10pm Saturday & Sunday: 8am - 8pm

Educators 

Giffgaff predominantly uses remote workers as part-time community moderators, called Educators, to monitor and patrol their online community forum. They regularly remove, edit, or modify content which they perceive as going against their community guidelines and have often banned contributions that do not in their view, Toe the company line.

Payback 
Giffgaff offers payback points to members who recruit other members and who provide customer service to the Giffgaff community. Previously members who suggested ideas on their Giffgaff Labs platform (which closed in 2021) also received payback points. Payback points can be exchanged for real money, added as airtime credit, or donated to five charities (this option was added in 2020) nominated by members and paid out biannually in June and December. Giffgaff promises to match their members' charitable donations, pound for pound. Giffgaff itself is an old Scottish word for 'mutual giving' and the company states they attempt to maintain that ethos as much as possible.

Super Recruiters 
When Giffgaff members recruit 15 new members to join the network, they are promoted to super recruiter status permanently, earning potentially larger rewards depending on their recruit's second and subsequent payments to Giffgaff and ongoing member retention. Super recruiters are also eligible to receive other benefits, such as dedicated email support, marketing materials, phone calls with employees, and visits to Giffgaff's HQ.

Ownership 
Giffgaff is a wholly owned subsidiary of Telefónica UK Ltd, which trades under the brand name of O2 UK inside the United Kingdom.

As part of the merger of Liberty Global and Telefónica's UK-based assets, Giffgaff's parent company, Telefónica UK, is now a 50-50 joint venture of these two companies, while Giffgaff remains wholly owned by Telefónica UK.

Network service and infrastructure

4G 
As of September 2015, all of Giffgaff's "goodybags" come with 4G data included at no extra cost. If the user doesn't have a 4G ready device or is not in a 4G area, the device will connect to O2's 3G or 2G network instead.

5G 
Giffgaff implemented 5G on their "Golden Goodybag" range using their new 5G SIMs on 7 January 2021. Initially, only new 5G SIMs would work on the technology, but later access was extended to existing 4G SIM cards. 

Giffgaff's 5G, like all their network services, runs on O2's network. O2 rolled out their 5G network access to O2 customers in October 2019.

Awards 
In November 2010, Giffgaff won the Forrester Groundswell Award and was later nominated for the 'Marketing Society's Brand of the Year' award, losing to the department store John Lewis. In December 2010, Giffgaff won the 'Most Innovative Community Award' at the Social CRM Customer Excellence Awards. 

In June 2012, Giffgaff was named the Best MVNO at the Mobile Industry Awards.

In 2014 and 2015, Giffgaff won the Which? best telecom services provider award. In 2018, Giffgaff was a runner-up in the Best Utilities Provider of the Year Awards.

In 2019, Which? reviewed 13 mobile network's customers. Giffgaff was rated the best network by the sample surveyed.

Since 2016, Giffgaff has regularly won the uSwitch Network of the Year award for 5 consecutive years. They also won three other uSwitch awards in 2019, for Best SIM Only Network, Best Network for Data, and Best PAYG Network.

In 2022 and 2023, according to uSwitch, the public voted for giffgaff as the network of the year.

Controversies

Unlimited internet 
After "goodybags" with unlimited internet allowance were introduced, complaints were made to the Advertising Standards Authority (ASA) from customers who were refused the further sale of unlimited plans. The reason given by Giffgaff for their disconnection was a clause in the terms and conditions stating "[We may disconnect you] if you do anything ... which we reasonably think adversely impacts the service to other Giffgaff customers or may adversely affect the Network". The complaint was not upheld by the ASA who concluded that unlimited internet was advertised correctly. Giffgaff noted that their customer service agents had used the clause above incorrectly and promised to rectify this.

Giffgaff removed the "goodybags" in question and replaced their unlimited internet allowance with an "Always On" data allowance. This means that users will get 80 GB of full-speed data usage but after these 80 GB, will be speed-limited to 385 kbps between 8 am and midnight every day. However on 20 October 2020, the company reintroduced a version of their unlimited monthly (Golden) Goodybag to recurring customers only, priced at £35.

Advertising campaigns 
In May 2013, Giffgaff ran an online and television advertising campaign with the strapline "Don't be scared", which featured zombies converging on a village. Although the television advert appeared after the 9 pm watershed, the ASA received 105 complaints. The ASA did not uphold the complaints, stating that it was not in breach of any BCAP rules.

In October 2013, Giffgaff ran two adverts in an online campaign with the strapline "Different takes guts". The advert featured a crowd of people dressed in white in an empty swimming pool throwing guts at each other. The ASA upheld the complaints that the content was in violation of BCAP rules for harm and offence, and also BCAP rule 5.2 because the advert was not suitably age rated. It was recommended that the advert not appear again in its current form.

In August 2014, Giffgaff ran three adverts in an online campaign with the strapline "At home with your parents you're not the boss" which featured siblings being subjected to awkward situations with their parents, one of which was reported to the ASA and featured an adult son walking in on his parents as they were engaged in sexual intercourse. The ASA upheld the complaint that the content was in violation of BCAP rule 4.1 for harm and offence and recommended that the advert not appear again in its current form.

References

External links 
 

2009 establishments in the United Kingdom
Mobile virtual network operators
Telecommunications companies established in 2009
Telecommunications in the United Kingdom